The Bye Aerospace eFlyer4, originally named the  Bye Aerospace Sun Flyer 4, is an American electric aircraft under development by Bye Aerospace of Denver, Colorado. The design was announced at the 2017 AirVenture airshow in Oshkosh, Wisconsin. The aircraft will be type certified and supplied complete and ready-to-fly.

Design and development
The eFlyer 4 was developed from the smaller two-seat Bye Aerospace eFlyer 2. It features a cantilever low-wing, a four-seat enclosed cockpit under a bubble canopy, fixed tricycle landing gear with wheel pants and a single electric motor in tractor configuration.

The aircraft is made from composite material, predominantly carbon fiber reinforced polymer. The standard engine used is a  electric powerplant. The aircraft will have ten batteries giving it a four-hour endurance.
The launch customer for the design is the Spartan College of Aeronautics and Technology which also has the eFlyer 2 on order for the flight training role.

Development should follow completion of the smaller eFlyer 2 two-seat trainer. Bye received 220 orders for the two models by October 2018 and at that time forecast that a prototype should fly in mid-2019.

At AirVenture in July 2021 George Bye of Bye Aerospace stated that the eFlyer 4 will be certified in late 2023 or early 2024.

Orders
Spartan College of Aeronautics and Technology
BlackBird, 100 aircraft
Quantum Air, 22 aircraft

Specifications (eFlyer 4)

See also

References

External links

Sun Flyer 4
Proposed aircraft of the United States

Single-engined tractor aircraft
Low-wing aircraft
Electric aircraft